The 1957 NCAA Skiing Championships were contested at Snow Basin at Mount Ogden, Utah, at the fourth annual NCAA-sanctioned ski tournament to determine the individual and team national champions of men's collegiate alpine skiing, cross-country skiing, and ski jumping in the United States.

Denver claimed its fourth national championship in as many years, all under coach Willy Schaeffler, topping in-state rivals Colorado in the team standings.

The sole repeat individual champion was Dartmouth's Chiharu Igaya in the slalom, his third consecutive and sixth individual NCAA title. He was the silver medalist in slalom at the 1956 Winter Olympics.

Venue

These championships were held March 29–31 in Utah at Snow Basin, located on Mount Ogden in Weber County, north of Salt Lake City.

The fourth edition, these were the first NCAA championships in Utah and the Wasatch Range. Later contracted to "Snowbasin", the ski area hosted the alpine speed events of the 2002 Winter Olympics.

Team scoring

Individual events

Four events were held, which yielded seven individual titles.
Friday: Cross Country
Saturday: Downhill
Sunday: Slalom, Jumping

See also
List of NCAA skiing programs

References

Ski
NCAA Skiing Championships
1957 in American sports
1957 in alpine skiing
1957 in cross-country skiing
1957 in ski jumping
Skiing in Utah